Slim Butte Creek is a stream in the U.S. state of South Dakota.

Slim Butte Creek takes its name from nearby Slim Butte.

See also
List of rivers of South Dakota

References

Rivers of Fall River County, South Dakota
Rivers of Oglala Lakota County, South Dakota
Rivers of South Dakota